A Hawaii overprint note is one of a series of banknotes (one silver certificate and three Federal Reserve Notes) issued during World War II as an emergency issue after the attack on Pearl Harbor. The intent of the overprints was to easily distinguish US currency captured by Imperial Japanese forces in the event of an invasion of Hawaii and render the notes worthless. Although a sizeable number of the notes were recalled and destroyed after the end of World War II, many escaped destruction and exist as collectibles of numismatic interest in the present day.

Issue

After the attack on Pearl Harbor, military officials surmised that in the event of an invasion of Hawaii, Imperial Japanese forces would have access to a considerable amount of US currency that could be seized from financial institutions or private individuals. Faced with this scenario, on January 10, 1942, Military Governor Delos Carleton Emmons issued an order to recall all regular US currency in the islands, save for set caps on how much money both individuals and businesses (save extra currency for payroll purposes) could possess at any time.

On June 25, 1942, new overprinted notes were first issued. Overprints of the word HAWAII were made; two small overprints to the sides of the obverse of the note between the border and both the treasury seal and Federal Reserve Bank of San Francisco seal, and large outlined  lettering dominating the reverse. The purpose was that should there have been an Imperial Japanese invasion of the islands, the US government could immediately declare any Hawaii-printed notes worthless, due to their easy identification.
With this issue, military officials prohibited the use of non-overprinted notes and ordered all Hawaii residents to turn in regular notes for Hawaii-overprinted notes by July 15, 1942. Beginning on August 15, 1942, no other paper U.S. currency could be used except under special permission.

Destruction of recalled notes

Faced with a  million stockpile of US currency, military officials opted to destroy all the recalled regular currency instead of overcoming the logistical problems of shipping the notes back to the mainland. At first, a local crematorium was pressed into service to burn the notes. To ensure complete destruction, a fine mesh was placed on the top of the chimneys to catch and recirculate unburnt scraps of currency escaping the fire.

Destruction of the notes was slow, and pressed with time, the bigger furnaces of the Aiea sugar mill were requisitioned to help burn the currency.

Use

The notes and issuance continued in use until October 21, 1944; by April 1946, notes were being recalled, but many were not destroyed and are still legal tender at their face value, though their numismatic value is considerably higher. Many notes were saved as curios and souvenirs by servicemen.

As a collectible

Of the series, the  note is considered the most desirable, as a little over 9 million examples were printed. Over 35 million  notes were made, making them the most common of the series. Star notes exist for all the notes, and command a sizable premium.

Notes

a.  Simpson notes Oahu Cemetery as the first burn site;  however, Medcalf notes Nuuanu Mortuary as the first burn site when interviewed by the Honolulu Advertiser.

References

Notes

Cited literature
Budnick, Rich (2005). Hawaii's Forgotten History: the good...the bad...the embarrassing. Aloha Press. .
Friedberg, Arthur L. & Ira S. (2008) The Official Red Book. A Guide Book Of United States Paper Money: Complete Source for History, Grading, and Prices (Second Edition) Whitman Publishing 
Simpson, MacKinnon (2008). Hawaii Homefront: Life in the Islands during World War II. Bess Press. .

Paper money of the United States
Japan–Hawaii relations
History of Hawaii